Pensions in Pakistan are provisions which are provided to retired employees. Because only the retired formal sector mostly benefits from pensions, most of the social schemes and retirement welfare system in the country cover a small proportion of the old-age population, whereas a significant proportion of the elderly population working in the informal sector remains largely unprotected by these social security schemes. There have been calls for devising and implementing reform in the pension sector of the country in a way where there is efficient deployment of resources and the eligible, yet economically disadvantaged portion of the retired population, is also entitled to receive and be endowed with this social security right.

References

External links
 Pakistan Pension Fund (PPF)
 National Savings - Pension Accounts
 Pension and Social Security Schemes in Pakistan: Some Policy Options
 Overseas Pakistanis Foundation - Pensions
 Employees Old-Age Benefits